The 1940 Macdonald Brier, the Canadian men's national curling championship, was held from March 4 to 7, 1940 at the Winnipeg Amphitheatre in Winnipeg, Manitoba. This was the first Brier to be held outside The Granite Club in Toronto as the Brier became more of a national event as it would travel around the country. Winnipeg was chosen to host the event after an invitation from the Manitoba Curling Association, and due to Manitoba's dominance at the Brier up to that point.

Team Manitoba, who was skipped by Howard "Pappy" Wood, captured the Brier Tankard in their hometown by finishing undefeated in round robin play with a 9-0 record.  Wood had only assembled the team prior to deadline for entries for that year's MCA Bonspiel, which they ended up winning. 

The final draw attracted 5,000 fans, the largest attendance for a curling match up to that point. 

This was Manitoba's ninth Brier championship overall and the second time that Wood's rink won the Brier with their first coming in 1930 in a tiebreaker. This was also the fourth time that a Brier champion finished unbeaten.

In addition to being the first Brier outside Toronto, the Winnipeg Brier was the first to ban curlers from bringing their own stones to compete with. Stones also had coloured tops for the first time, to aid spectators in the arena to determine which team's rocks were which. Also for the first time in Brier history, every team at the Brier had qualified via a provincial championship. At the time, every provincial championship except for New Brunswick was sponsored by Macdonald Tobacco's British Consols product. The New Brunswick championship was sponsored by Ganong Bros.

Teams
The teams are listed as follows:

Round-robin standings

Round-robin results

Draw 1

Draw 2

Draw 3

Draw 4

Draw 5

Draw 6

Draw 7

Draw 8

Draw 9

References 

Macdonald Brier, 1940
Macdonald Brier, 1940
The Brier
Curling competitions in Winnipeg
Macdonald Brier
Macdonald Brier